Magic in Town is a 1968 Danish comedy film directed by Annelise Reenberg and starring Jeanne Darville.

Cast
Jeanne Darville as Else Berg
William Rosenberg as Peter Berg
Pusle Helmuth as Pusle Berg
Jan Priiskorn-Schmidt as Jan Berg
Vibeke Houlberg as Lotte Berg
Michael Rosenberg as Michael Berg
Sonja Oppenhagen as Rikke Berg
Lars Madsen as Blop Berg
Sigrid Horne-Rasmussen as Fru Jensen
Karen Berg as Tante Alma
Dirch Passer as Dr. Mogensen
Ove Sprogøe as Politiassistent Møller
Bjørn Puggaard-Müller as Overbetjent Pedersen
Karl Stegger as Advokat Andersen
Thecla Boesen as Fru Edel Andersen

References

External links

1968 films
1968 comedy films
Danish comedy films
1960s Danish-language films
Films directed by Annelise Reenberg
Films scored by Sven Gyldmark